Catopsilia is a genus of butterflies in the family Pieridae, commonly called migrants or emigrants.

Species
Ordered alphabetically.
Catopsilia florella (Fabricius, 1775) – African emigrant, African migrant, or common vagrant
Catopsilia gorgophone (Boisduval, 1836) – yellow migrant
Catopsilia pomona (Fabricius, 1775) – common emigrant or lemon emigrant
Catopsilia pyranthe (Linnaeus, 1758) – mottled emigrant or white migrant
Catopsilia scylla (Linnaeus, 1763) – orange emigrant or orange migrant
Catopsilia thauruma (Reakirt, 1866) – Madagascar migrant

References

External links
Catopsilia

Coliadinae
Pieridae genera
Taxa named by Jacob Hübner